Rumex hydrolapathum, the great water dock, water dock, or giant water dock, is a species of perennial herbaceous plants in the genus Rumex native to fens and freshwater banks of Europe and Western Asia. It is one of the small number of decaploid organisms, containing two hundred individual chromosomes.

Description
These have smooth margins and are generally unwrinkled. These leaves are large and taper at both ends, and their lateral veins are at right angles to the midrib. In subsequent years it produces an upright flowering stem, unbranched until the base of the inflorescence. The stem is tough, grooved, green when young but turning reddish with age. Leaves growing on the stem are alternate, arching and decreasing in size higher up the stem. The inflorescence is a compound raceme. The numerous small flowers are regular, with the perianth segments in two whorls of three, the outer whorl spreading and the inner one covering the developing fruits. There are six stamens, three fused carpels and three styles. The fruit is a triangular–ovate achene, at first green then brown. This plant flowers from June to September.

Distribution and habitat
The great water dock is a native of Europe and western Asia. It grows beside lakes and rivers and the sea. It is usually close to the margin of the water line or growing in shallow water.

References

External links
 
 

hydrolapathum
Flora of Europe
Flora of Western Asia